Stéphane Lievre (born 3 October 1972) is a French former professional footballer who played as a defender between 1992 and 2006.

Born in Paris, he played his entire career in France for three clubs: Stade Malherbe Caen, FC Nantes and Toulouse FC.

External links
 Statistics & biography at TFC.info

1972 births
Living people
Footballers from Paris
Association football defenders
Stade Malherbe Caen players
FC Nantes players
Toulouse FC players
Ligue 1 players
Ligue 2 players
French footballers